Košarkaški klub Dubrovnik is a professional basketball club based in Dubrovnik, Croatia. It competes in the second Croatian division.

History
The club was founded in 1946 and played all most of its history in lower Yugoslavian and then Croatian leagues. In 2004 KK Dubrovnik finally managed to qualify for the first league and they have been playing there ever since.

Notable players 
 Lukša Andrić
 Adnan Bečić
 Denis Bajramović
 Andro Knego
 Nikola Prkačin
 Hrvoje Perić
 Ante Tomić
 Mario Hezonja

External links
Official Website

KK Dubrovnik
Basketball teams in Croatia
Basketball teams established in 1946
Basketball teams in Yugoslavia